Mexico Senior High School is a high school in Mexico, Missouri, USA.

Notable alumni
 Pendleton Dudley - American journalist and public relations executive, attended for two years and dropped out 
 Tyronn Lue - American professional basketball coach and former player, attended for one year and transferred
 Jouett Shouse - American lawyer, newspaper publisher, and leading Democratic politician

References

Public high schools in Missouri
Schools in Audrain County, Missouri